Vaghinag Bekaryan (January 5, 1891 – June 15, 1975) was an Armenian pedagogue, poet, and writer.

Biography 
Bekaryan was born in 1891 in Bardizag, Turkey where Armenians had settled. He received his primary education at his local school and later continued in Constantinople's Getronagan Armenian High School. In 1908, after the Ottoman Constitution of 1908, Bekaryan and his wife moved to Afyonkarahisar and the two started teaching at the National Central High School. In 1915, Bekaryan was invited to Jerusalem's Theological Seminary to teach, where his family spent the days of the Armenian genocide. After the Genocide, he taught the refugee Musaler community at Port Said. In 1916, the Ethiopian Armenian community invited Bekaryan to Addis Ababa where he established an Armenian school. In 1922, Bekaryan moved to Paris, and in 1925 he moved to Armenia. Bekaryan graduated from the National Polytechnic University of Armenia from the Faculty of Chemistry. During his studies, he taught in Etchmiadzin, Yerevan's schools and Pedagogical Institute.

Work 
The diaspora press published his prose and poetry works. During 1923 to 1924, he was a contributor for "Gotchnak Armenia" and "Haratch" newspapers under the pseudonym, Abel Miachikyan.

 Verses - 1925
 "The Fake Bride" (novelette) 1945, 1963 Yerevan
 "Hell on Earth" (novel) - 1959, Yerevan
 "In Garni", "Teaching Memories", "Childhood Memories" (one book) - 1967, Yerevan
 "You are Innocent" (novelette) - 1970, Yerevan
 "Vagharshapat" (not published)
 "One year in Etchmiadzin" (not published)

References 

20th-century Turkish poets
Turkish writers
1891 births
1975 deaths
Armenians from the Ottoman Empire
Turkish male poets
20th-century male writers
Expatriates in Ottoman Palestine
Turkish expatriates in Ethiopia
Turkish emigrants to the Soviet Union